The 2000 Pilot Pen Tennis was a tennis tournament played on outdoor hard courts. It was the 18th edition of the Pilot Pen Tennis, and is part of the Tier II Series of the 2000 WTA Tour. It took place at the Cullman-Heyman Tennis Center in New Haven, United States, from 20 to 26 through August 2000.

Finals

Singles

  Venus Williams defeated  Monica Seles, 6–2, 6–4.
It was the 4th title for Williams in the season and the 13th title on her singles career. It was also her 2nd title in New Haven.

Doubles

  Julie Halard-Decugis /  Ai Sugiyama defeated  Virginia Ruano Pascual /  Paola Suárez, 6–4, 5–7, 6–2.
It was the 11th title for Halard-Decugis and the 14th title for Sugiyama in their respective doubles careers.
It was also the 3rd title for the pair during the season, after their wins in Sydney and Miami.

References

External links
 Official Results Archive (ITF)
 Official Results Archive (WTA)

Pilot Pen Tennis
2000
Pilot Pen Tennis
Pilot Pen
2000 Pilot Pen Tennis
Pilot Pen Tennis